The Lake Lerma salamander (Ambystoma lermaense) is an extremely rare, occasionally neotenic mole salamander species from Mexico.

Description

The Lake Lerma salamander was first described by herpetologist Edward Harrison Taylor from a holotype found east of Toluca in 1940. Its habitat is the Lerma River and Lake Lerma in the Toluca Valley in the central highland of Mexico in an altitude of 2800-3000m asl. Drainage of the marshes destroyed almost the whole Lake Lerma wetlands complex with the consequence that this species became locally extinct in that area. Pollution and the building of dams at the Lerma River in the Almoloya region along the villages Tenango, Santa Maria, Jajalpa and San Pedro, as well as domestic consumption, led also to a catastrophic decline of the populations. This species is listed in Appendix II CITES and as Endangered in the IUCN red list due to the lack of information according its occurrence.

References

  Database entry includes a range map and justification for why this species is critically endangered

Mole salamanders
Amphibians described in 1940
Lerma River